Hoya is a genus of over 500 accepted species of tropical plants in the dogbane family, Apocynaceae. Most are native to several countries of Asia such as the Philippines, India, Thailand, Malaysia, Vietnam, Bangladesh, Indonesia, Polynesia, New Guinea, and many species are also found in Australia.

Common names for this genus are waxplant, waxvine, waxflower or simply hoya. This genus was named by botanist Robert Brown, in honour of his friend, botanist Thomas Hoy.

Description

Hoyas are evergreen perennial creepers or vines or rarely, shrubs. They often grow epiphytically on trees; some grow terrestrially, or occasionally in rocky areas. They climb by twining, and with the employment of adventitious roots. Larger species grow , or more, with suitable support in trees. They have simple entire leaves, arranged in an opposite pattern, that are typically succulent. Leaves may exhibit a variety of forms, and may be smooth, felted or hairy; venation may be prominent or not, and many species have leaf surfaces flecked with irregular small silvery spots.

The flowers appear in axillary umbellate clusters at the tip of peduncles. Hoya peduncles are commonly referred to as spurs. In most species these spurs are perennial and are rarely shed. Each flowering cycle increases the length of the spur, and in the larger species can eventually reach  or more. Flower form is typically star-shaped, with five thick, waxy, triangular petals, topped with another star-shaped structure, the corona. Colours on most species range from white to pink; there are species that exhibit yellow to orange, dark reds to near-black, and there are green flowers. Many are sweetly scented. and most produce abundant nectar.

Pollinators include moths, flies, and ants. Pollination is poorly understood, but plants left outdoors in temperate regions do sometimes produce seed, indicating pollination by local insects.

Seeds are borne in twin pods, actually follicles, are generally light, and are dispersed by the wind by means of a small tuft of silky fluff. Germination is rapid, but viability is not long.

At least some species exhibit Crassulacean Acid Metabolism (CAM), including H. carnosa.

Several species exhibit adaptations for mutualism with ants by providing modified leaves for domatia ("homes"), much as in the related genus Dischidia; H. imbricata has leaves that form a concave cup over the tree trunk it climbs up to shelter ants, and H. darwinii has arrangements of bullate leaves on its stems to form shelters.

Leaves
Hoya leaves vary in size, texture, colour and venation. In size, leaves range from as small as 5 mm in length and 2 to 4 mm in width (Hoya engleriana Hosseus) to as large as 25 cm by 35 cm. (Hoya latifolia G. Don). Hoya coriacea Blume, has been reported to have leaves as long as two feet in length. There are hoyas with almost perfectly round leaves and others with linear leaves (Hoya linearis Wall. ex. D. Don and Hoya teretifolia Griff. ex Hook. f.). One popular species, Hoya shepherdii Short ex Hook. has leaves that resemble string beans hanging in bunches from their stalks. Hoya linearis Wall. ex D. Don is covered with fine downy hair and resembles masses of Spanish Moss (Tillandsia usneoides) hanging from trees in its native habitat. Some Hoya leaves appear to be veinless while others have very conspicuous veins of a lighter or darker colour than the rest of the leaves as in H. cinnomomifolia. Some have leaves that are mottled with speckles of silvery white (Hoya carnosa R. Br., Hoya pubicalyx). Some hoyas have leaves that are thin and translucent (Hoya coriacea Blume); some are so thick and succulent that they look more like crassulas than hoyas (Hoya australis ssp. rupicola, oramicola and saniae from Australia and Hoya pachyclada from Thailand). One of the most succulent, Hoya kerrii Craib, has obcordate (inverse heart-shaped) leaves, with the cleft away from the stem.

Flowers

Hoya flowers are all shaped like five pointed stars. Some species' petals reflex so far that the flowers appear to be round or ball-like. They grow in umbels, or in some species singly. H. coriacea Blume has been known to have as many as 70 in an inflorescence, each individual measuring nearly 2 cm in diameter with the umbels over 30 cm in breadth. Textures of flower surfaces may be glabrous and shiny, to matte, to finely haired, and some being quite hairy. One of the two clones of Hoya mindorensis Schltr., from the Philippines, comes very close to being a true red. Blue, purples, and violets do not appear to be represented in the genus Hoya.

Selected species

Hoya archboldiana – Indonesia, Papua New Guinea
 Hoya australis – Australia, Fiji, Indonesia (Irian Jaya), Papua New Guinea, Solomon Islands, Tonga
Hoya bilobata – Philippines
Hoya carnosa – S. China, India, Japan, Taiwan, Australia (Queensland), Fiji
Hoya celebica
Hoya cinnamomifolia – Indonesia (Java)
Hoya imbricata – Indonesia (Sulawesi), Philippines
Hoya kerrii – China, Cambodia, Indonesia (Java), Laos, NW. Thailand, S. Vietnam
Hoya macgillivrayi – Australia (Queensland)
Hoya megalaster – Papua New Guinea
Hoya meliflua – Philippines
Hoya obscura – Philippines
Hoya serpens – Australia (Queensland), India (E. Himalaya), Nepal
Hoya siamica – Cambodia, India, Laos, NW. Thailand, Vietnam

Cultivation and uses

Many species of Hoya are popular houseplants in temperate areas (especially H. carnosa), grown for their attractive foliage and strongly scented flowers. Numerous cultivars have been selected for different leaf forms or flower colours. Hoyas grow well indoors, preferring bright light, but will tolerate fairly low light levels, although they may not flower without bright light. Hoyas commonly sold in nurseries as houseplants include cultivars of H. carnosa (Krimson Queen, Hindu Rope − compacta), H. pubicalyx (often mislabelled as H. carnosa or H. purpurea-fusca), and H. kerrii. Hoyas are easy to propagate, and are commonly sold as cuttings, either rooted or unrooted, or as a potted plant.

Hoya carnosa has been shown in recent studies at the University of Georgia to be an excellent remover of pollutants in the indoor environment.

Various cultures have used hoyas medicinally, especially Polynesian cultures. Some are toxic to livestock and sheep poisonings in Australia are reported.

Several Hoya species and cultivars are excellent terrarium plants.

References

Bibliography
 
 
 
 
 Liede-Schumann, S. (2006). The Genera of Asclepiadoideae, Secamonoideae and Periplocoideae (Apocynaceae): Descriptions, Illustrations, Identification, and Information Retrieval Version: 21 September 2000.
 
 
 
 Zachos, Ellen (1997), "Practical Uses of Various Hoya Species"

External links

 Plants of the World Online | Kew Science https://powo.science.kew.org/taxon/urn:lsid:ipni.org:names:60437256-2

 
Apocynaceae genera